
Year 239 BC was a year of the pre-Julian Roman calendar. At the time it was known as the Year of the Consulship of Turrinus and Falto (or, less frequently, year 515 Ab urbe condita). The denomination 239 BC for this year has been used since the early medieval period, when the Anno Domini calendar era became the prevalent method in Europe for naming years.

Events 
 By place 
 Carthage 
 Concerned that Hamilcar Barca's leniency in pardoning those who he has captured who have participated in the Mercenary War will encourage others to defect, Mathos and Spendius order the mutilation and execution of "about seven hundred" Carthaginian prisoners, including Gesco. With the mercenaries jointly guilty of these atrocities, defectors dare not face Carthaginian justice under Hamilcar.
 Carthage is besieged by the mercenary armies, while the city of Utica revolts and attempts to secede from Carthage. Carthage appeals to Hiero II of Syracuse and to Rome for aid against the mercenaries. However, the mercenary leaders reject the efforts of Roman mediators.
 Sardinia revolts against Carthage and Rome takes the opportunity to annex the island.

 Greece 
 Antigonus II, King of Macedonia, dies and is succeeded by his son, Demetrius II.
 With Aetolia now as its ally, the Achaean League under the command of Aratus of Sicyon repeatedly attacks Athens and Argos.

 Seleucid Empire 
 Seleucus II's brother Antiochus Hierax, who is governor of Seleucid Anatolia, sends an army into Syria ostensibly to assist Seleucus but actually to seize the rest of the empire. After achieving peace with Egypt, Seleucus II promptly invades Anatolia and begins the "War of the Brothers".

 Persia 
 Diodotus of Bactria defeats an army of Parthians. He dies shortly thereafter and is succeeded by his son Diodotus II.

 China 
 Cheng Jiao, the half-brother of Ying Zheng, the king of Qin, is sent to attack the State of Zhao, but he attempts to usurp power and is defeated and executed.
 Qin Prime Minister Lü Buwei publishes the "Spring and Autumn Annals of Lü Buwei" (Lüshi Chunqiu).

 Korea 
 Haemosu, who is a descendant of the people of the empire of Gojoseon, establishes the ancient kingdom of Bukbuyeo in modern-day Jilin, northeast China.

Births 
 Quintus Ennius, Latin poet and writer, considered the father of Roman poetry (approximate date)

Deaths 
 Antigonus II Gonatas, king of Macedon from 277 BC who has rebuilt his kingdom's power and established its hegemony over Greece (b. c. 319 BC)
 Diodotus I, king of the Greco-Bactrian Kingdom (b. c. 285 BC)
 Huanhui of Han, Chinese king of the Han State

References